The Bachelor's Daughters is a 1946 American comedy film directed by Andrew L. Stone and written by Stone and Frederick J. Jackson. It stars Gail Russell, Claire Trevor, Ann Dvorak, Adolphe Menjou, Billie Burke, Jane Wyatt and Eugene List. The film was released on September 6, 1946, by United Artists.

Plot
A department store floor walker is persuaded by four husband-seeking salesgirls to pose as their father in a Long Island mansion which they have rented by pooling resources and pretending to be wealthy themselves

Cast 
Gail Russell as Eileen MacFarland
Claire Trevor as Cynthia Davis
Ann Dvorak as Terry Wilson
Adolphe Menjou as Alexander Moody
Billie Burke as Molly Burns
Jane Wyatt as Marta Jordan
Eugene List as Schuyler Johnson
Damian O'Flynn as Rex Miller
John Whitney as Bruce Farrington
Russell Hicks as John Llewelyn Dillon
Earle Hodgins as Dr. Johnson
Madge Crane as Mrs. Johnson
Bill Kennedy as Mr. Stapp
Richard Hageman as Mr. Johnson
Igor Dicga as Dancer
Clayton Moore as Bill Cotter

Radio adaptation
The Bachelor's Daughters was presented on This Is Hollywood November 16, 1946. Russell and Menjou reprised their film roles in the adaptation, which also starred Gail Patrick.

References

External links 
 

1946 films
American black-and-white films
Films directed by Andrew L. Stone
United Artists films
1946 comedy films
American comedy films
1940s English-language films
1940s American films